The 2016–17 VCU Rams women's basketball team will represent Virginia Commonwealth University  during the 2016–17 NCAA Division I women's basketball season. The Rams, led by third year head coach Beth O’Boyle. The Rams were members of the Atlantic 10 Conference and play their home games at the Stuart C. Siegel Center. They finished the season 16–15, 8–8 in A-10 play to finish in a tie for seventh place. They advanced to the quarterfinals of the A-10 women's tournament where they lost to Dayton.

Roster

Schedule

|-
!colspan=9 style="background:#000000; color:#F8B800;"| Regular season

|-
!colspan=9 style="background:#000000; color:#F8B800;"| Atlantic 10 Women's Tournament

Rankings

See also
 2016–17 VCU Rams men's basketball team

References

VCU
VCU Rams women's basketball seasons
VCU Rams women's basketball